Oh Bong-Jin  (born June 30, 1989) is a South Korean footballer who currently plays as left winger for Ulsan Hyundai Mipo Dockyard in the Korea National League. He was the member of South Korea national under-20 football team.

External links
 

1989 births
Living people
Association football midfielders
South Korean footballers
Jeju United FC players
Gimcheon Sangmu FC players
Daejeon Hana Citizen FC players
Ulsan Hyundai Mipo Dockyard FC players
K League 1 players
Korea National League players